The 2021–22 Clemson Tigers women's basketball team represented Clemson University during the 2021–22 college basketball season. The Tigers were led by fourth year head coach Amanda Butler. The Tigers, members of the Atlantic Coast Conference, played their home games at Littlejohn Coliseum.

During the offseason, assistant coach Shimmy Gray-Miller left Clemson to become assistant coach at Minnesota.  The Tigers hired Priscilla Edwards as her replacement.

The Tigers finished the season 10–21 and 3–15 in ACC play to finish in thirteenth place.  In the ACC tournament, they defeated twelfth seeded Syracuse in the First Round before losing to fifth seed Virginia Tech in the Second Round. They were not invited to the NCAA tournament or the WNIT.

Previous season
The Tigers finished the 2020–21 season 12–14 and 5–12 in ACC play to finish in eleventh place. In the ACC tournament, they defeated Notre Dame in the Second Round before losing to Georgia Tech in the Quarterfinals. They received an at-large bid to the WNIT. They defeated Ohio in the First Round before losing to Delaware in the Second Round to end their season.

Offseason

Departures

Incoming Transfers

2021 recruiting class

Source:

Roster
Source:

Mid-Season Departures

Schedule
Source: 

|- 
!colspan=9 style=| Regular Season

|-
!colspan=9 style=| ACC Women's Tournament

Rankings

See also
 2021–22 Clemson Tigers men's basketball team

References

Clemson Tigers women's basketball seasons
Clemson
Clemson Tigers
Clemson Tigers